Cindy Fabre (born 26 September 1985 in Cosne-Cours-sur-Loire, Nièvre) is a French beauty pageant titleholder who has competed at the Miss Europe, Miss Universe, and Miss World pageants.

Fabre was elected Miss France in 2005. She succeeded Lætitia Bléger as the 47st Miss France on 4 December 2004. In March 2005 she represented France in the Miss Europe pageant where she was 2nd runner-up. In May, she competed at the Miss Universe 2005 pageant in Bangkok, Thailand, won by Natalie Glebova of Canada. In December she competed in the Miss World 2005 pageant, won by Iceland's Unnur Birna Vilhjálmsdóttir. Fabre did not place in either Miss Universe or Miss World.

In August 2022, she was announced as the new national director of Miss France, taking over from Sylvie Tellier, who had served in the position since 2007.

Private life
In July 2012, she announced that she was pregnant with her first child. On November 15, 2012, she gave birth to a boy, Elio.

With her companion Jean-Marc, she ran the restaurant La Fabrik in Cannes.

References

External links
 Cindy Fabre official website

1985 births
French beauty pageant winners
French female models
Living people
Miss France winners
Miss Universe 2005 contestants
Miss World 2005 delegates
People from Nièvre